Deerwalk Institute of Technology is a private college established in 2010 in collaboration between Nepalese entrepreneurs and the United States-based software company, Deerwalk Inc.

It is an affiliation to Tribhuvan University, which is the oldest University in Nepal. Within the affiliation of Tribhuvan University, DWIT offers two undergraduate programs, Bsc.CSIT and BCA.

History 

Deerwalk Institute of Technology was founded by Rudra Raj Pandey in 2010. It was first established collaboration between Nepalese entrepreneurs and the US-based software company, Deerwalk Inc.
The first batch had a total of eight students.

Buildings and infrastructure 
The DWIT campus is situated in Sifal, Kathmandu. With a garden and canteen in its front yard, DWIT building stands four-storey tall. The top-storey is occupied by Sagarmatha Hall where all the major sessions are held. It is a spacious establishment with a capacity of over 100 people.

Library 
DWIT Library consists of a significant number of books related to Computer Science.It is solely handled by Students interns at DWIT.

All of the library transactions are done using Gyansangalo, DWIT's Library Management System.

Cafeteria 
The DWIT cafeteria is situated at the front yard of the DWIT building. An online portal,Canteen Management System is used  to carry out the canteen transactions.

All members associated with DWIT can login into the system using their respective dwit emails and order the food from a range of food options.

Academics
DWIT offers Bachelors of Science in Computer Science and Information Technology (B. Sc. CSIT) and Bachelor in Computer Application (BCA) run under the curriculum of Tribhuvan University.These are among the comprehensive computer science courses offered by Tribhuvan University. The four-year course is categorized into two domains – Computer Science and Mathematics. In the first three-semester the course mainly consists of mathematics and basic programming concepts. In the latter semesters, the course progresses towards computational theory and artificial intelligence.

Student life 
The students in DWIT come from different cities and towns of Nepal.

Clubs and activities 
There are twelve student-run clubs in DWIT, considered and established by students solely. Each club has a club president, a club vice-president, and five members at its core. Major activities and fundraising events are organized by the clubs.

Internship

Deerwalk Services 
Deerwalk is a privately held company based in Lexington, Massachusetts, with over 300 employees worldwide, including a technology campus, DWIT. DWIT and Deerwalk Services occupy the same territory.

Deerhold Nepal 
Deerwalk Compware or Deerhold Nepal is a subsidiary of Deerwalk Group and was founded in July 2017. It is the provider of IT consulting services, custom software development and IT products-distributor in Nepal.

Research

DWIT Research and Development Unit (R&D Unit) 

The DWIT Research and Development (R&D) team is the innovative unit of DWIT. The goal of the team is typically to research new products and services and add to the DWIT facilities and the society. The students of DWIT work in this department as interns.

The major task of the team is the production of digital video classes. The video lectures are distributed for free by Deerwalk Learning Center. The videos are interactive learning resources for Grades 4-12, designed as per the curriculum prescribed by Curriculum Development Center.The videos have an estimated reach of more than 30 Lakhs in Nepal.

DWIT Incubation-center 

DWIT provides a workplace for budding and neo-startups, known as the Incubation Center.It is a space given to student entrepreneurs to develop their businesses in the initial and transitional phases. The facility is provided until the start-ups are moderately stable.

References

External links 
Deerwalk Foods
DWIT News
Deerwalk Learning Center
Deerwalk

Education in Kathmandu
Technical universities and colleges